A hemostat (also called a hemostatic clamp, arterial forceps, or pean after Jules-Émile Péan) is a surgical tool used in many surgical procedures to control bleeding. For this reason, it is common in the initial phases of surgery for the initial incision to be lined with hemostats which close blood vessels awaiting ligation.  Hemostats belong to a group of instruments that pivot (similar to scissors, and including needle holders, tissue holders and various clamps) where the structure of the tip determines its function.

The hemostat has handles that can be held in place by their locking mechanism. The locking mechanism is typically a series of interlocking teeth, a few on each handle, that allow the user to adjust the clamping force of the pliers.  When locked together, the force between the tips is approximately 40 N (9 lbf).

History
The earliest known drawing of a pivoting surgical instrument dates back to 1500 BC on a tomb at Thebes, Egypt. Later Roman bronze and steel pivot-controlled instruments were found in Pompeii. In the ninth century AD Abulcasis made illustrations of pivoting instruments for tooth extraction.

The concept of clamping a bleeding vessel with an instrument before tying it off is generally attributed to Galen (second century AD). This method of hemostasis was largely forgotten until it was rediscovered by the French barber-surgeon Ambroise Paré in the 16th century. He made the predecessor to the modern hemostat and called it the Bec de Corbin (crow's beak) (see image below). With it he could clamp a bleeding vessel before securing it with a ligature.

The modern hemostat is credited to several persons, the foremost of which is Jules-Émile Péan. Later surgeons (i.e. William Halsted) made minor alterations to the design.

List of hemostats

Rankin forceps
Kelly forceps
Satinsky clamps
Kocher forceps
Crile forceps
Halsted Mosquito forceps
Mixter "right angle" forceps
Spencer Wells artery forceps

See also
Forceps

References

Further reading
John Kirkup, MD, FRCS, The Evolution of Surgical Instruments - historyofscience.com

Medical clamps